Frederic may refer to:

Places

United States
 Frederic, Wisconsin, a village in Polk County
 Frederic Township, Michigan, a township in Crawford County
 Frederic, Michigan, an unincorporated community

Other uses
 Frederic (band), a Japanese rock band
 Frederic (given name), a given name (including a list of people and characters with the name)
 Hurricane Frederic, a hurricane that hit the U.S. Gulf Coast in 1979
 Trent Frederic, American ice hockey player

See also
 Frédéric
 Frederick (disambiguation)
 Fredrik
 Fryderyk (disambiguation)